Kureh-ye Olya (also Romanized as Kūreh-ye ‘Olyā; also known as Kūreh-ye Bālā) is a village in Anzal-e Jonubi Rural District, Anzal District, Urmia County, West Azerbaijan Province, Iran. At the 2006 census, its population was 220, in 42 families.

References 

Populated places in Urmia County